The Zoological Survey Department of Pakistan is a department under the Ministry of Climate Change, Government of Pakistan which carries out survey and research on distribution, population, and status of animal life in Pakistan.

See also
Pakistan Environmental Protection Agency
Wildlife of Pakistan

References

Pakistan federal departments and agencies
Science and technology in Pakistan
Environment of Pakistan